Craugastor nefrens is a species of frog in the family Craugastoridae. It is endemic to Guatemala and known from the Sierra de Caral in the Izabal Department; it is expected to occur in adjacent Honduras too. Its natural habitat is moist tropical forest where they are found at night perched on leaves 0.3–2 metres above the ground.

References

nefrens
Endemic fauna of Guatemala
Amphibians of Guatemala
Amphibians described in 2005
Taxonomy articles created by Polbot